Cionocoleus is an extinct genus of beetles in the family Ommatidae.

Species 
According to Kirejtshuk, 2020.
 Cionocoleus cervicalis Tan et al. 2007 Yixian Formation, China, Aptian
 Cionocoleus elizabethae Jarzembowski et al. 2013 Weald Clay, United Kingdom, Barremian
 Cionocoleus jepsoni Jarzembowski et al. 2013 Durlston Formation, United Kingdom, Berriasian
 Cionocoleus longicapitis Soriano & Delclòs, 2006 La Pedrera de Rúbies Formation, Spain, Barremian
 Cionocoleus magicus Ren, 1995 Yixian Formation, Lushangfen Formation, China, Aptian
 Cionocoleus minimus Jarzembowski et al. 2013 Weald Clay Formation, United Kingdom, Hauterivian
 Cionocoleus olympicus Jarzembowski et al. 2013 Yixian Formation, China, Aptian
 Cionocoleus ommamimus Ponomarenko, 1997 Anda-Khuduk Formation, Mongolia, Aptian
 Cionocoleus planiusculus Tan et al. 2007 Yixian Formation, China, Aptian
 Cionocoleus punctatus (Martynov 1926), Karabastau Formation, Kazakhstan, Callovian/Oxfordian
 Cionocoleus sibiricus Ponomarenko, 2000 Argun Formation, Russia, Aptian
 Cionocoleus tanae Jarzembowski et al. 2013 Yixian Formation, China, Aptian
 Cionocoleus watsoni Jarzembowski et al. 2013 Weald Clay Formation, United Kingdom, Barremian

References

Ommatidae
Prehistoric beetle genera